Helena Blagne(born 1963, in Jesenice) is a Slovenian vocalist.

References

External links
 Official website
 Profile, Proartes.si; accessed 31 January 2016.

1963 births
Living people
People from Jesenice, Jesenice
20th-century Slovenian women singers
Date of birth missing (living people)
21st-century Slovenian women singers